Epacris pinoidea is a species of flowering plant in the heath family Ericaceae and is endemic to a small area of eastern New South Wales. It is an erect to semi-erect shrub with flat, oblong to elliptic or lance-shaped leaves and white, tube-shaped flowers.

Description
Flowering occurs in January and February.

Taxonomy and naming
Epacris pinoidea was first formally described in 1996 by Ron Crowden and Yvonne Menadue in the Annals of Botany based on plant material collected in the Blue Mountains in 1975. The specific epithet (pinoidea) refers to the resemblance of young plants to a pine seedling.

Distribution and habitat
This epacris grows in sandstone rock fissures in forest on the ranges from the Grose River to the Budawang Range of eastern New South Wales.

References

pinoidea
Ericales of Australia
Flora of New South Wales
Plants described in 1996